The R-class submarines were a class of 12 small British diesel-electric submarines built for the Royal Navy during World War I, and were forerunners of the modern attack submarine, in that they were designed specifically to attack and sink enemy submarines, their battery capacity and hull shape being optimized for underwater performance.

Description
They were well-streamlined, having no external ballast tanks, casing, or deck gun, and a streamlined spindle-shaped hull of circular cross-section (not reproduced until the American USS Albacore) which tapered sharply towards the stern and allowed only for a single screw. The bulbous bow contained five sensitive hydrophones and the lightened conning tower was also well-streamlined.

Thirty-five percent of the space inside the pressure hull was occupied by machinery. A single 8-cylinder  diesel engine was installed for surface propulsion, while high underwater speed was given by two large electric motors arranged one behind the other to drive the single propeller shaft, and powered by a 200-cell battery of the same type fitted to J-class submarines. The large battery was, however, sufficient for only about an hour at full power. In addition, the engine took a full day to charge the batteries, using half its power. Charging was therefore undertaken in harbour, using a supply of electricity from the shore or from special battery charging vessels.

Despite being designed for maximum underwater performance, the R-class submarines were extremely difficult to control submerged, especially at high speeds. Surfaced, they had poor seakeeping and were slow.

Armament
The R class were the first Royal Navy submarines to be fitted with six bow torpedo tubes, number of torpedoes being considered more important than range or size of warhead carried when attacking U-boats. The torpedo tubes were originally the smaller  but later changed to 21 inch (533 mm).<ref>Gunston, p.114, "'British R class (33)"</ref> As designed, one spare torpedo was allowed for, but in operation six reloads were carried in place of the senior ratings' accommodation. It was originally intended to fit a  gun on the foredeck, but this was dropped due to the adverse effect it would have had on submerged speed.

ConstructionR1 through R4 were ordered from Chatham, R5 and R6 from Devonport (later changed to Pembroke), R7 and R8 from Vickers,  R9 and R10 from Armstrong, and R11 and R12 from Cammell Laird. In August 1919, with World War I over, R5 and R6 were cancelled, the rest being completed. To save time, they used H-class components.

Service
Operating out of Killybegs, Donegal, one of the class reportedly tracked and fired on a German U-boat in October 1918, firing a full salvo of six torpedoes. Only one hit, but it failed to detonate.

All but R4 and R10 were sold for scrap in 1923. The two survivors were relegated to ASW training at Portland. Pitched against poor performing naval trawlers, the trawlers were no match to the high performance of the submarines. R10 was sold in 1929, while R4 survived as a fast underwater target at Portland until 1934.

R-class submarines

 
 
 
 
 HMS R5 *
 HMS R6'' *
 
 
 
 
 
 

 * Cancelled while under construction

Notes

References

External links

R
British R-class submarines
R